Kurkse is a village in Lääne-Harju Parish, Harju County in northern Estonia.

Pictures

See also
Kurkse tragedy

References

 

Villages in Harju County
Kreis Harrien

sv:Padis#Byar